The Canarian Coalition (CC) is a regionalist, Canarian nationalist political party in Spain operating in the Canary Islands. The party's aim is for greater autonomy for the islands but not independence. It has been labeled as both conservative and liberal. The party governed the Canary Islands from 1993 to 2019.

It usually negotiates with the plurality party at the Cortes to form a majority in exchange for resources for the islands. It also governs the local administrations of Tenerife, La Palma, and Fuerteventura, as well as having majority control in some of the town councils on the Canary Islands.

History
The coalition was formed in February 1993 from a grouping of five parties (the largest being the Canarian Independent Groups) under one banner and has governed the Canary Islands since 1993, when it replaced the former Spanish Socialist Workers' Party (PSOE) administration after a motion of no confidence. After entering government, CC obtained power for the regional government to levy its own taxes and a law compensating the islands for their distance from the mainland. The coalition became a single party in 2005.

The political parties that formed the Coalition were:

 Canarian Independent Groups (Agrupaciones Independientes de Canarias)
 Nationalist Canarian Initiative (Iniciativa Canaria Nacionalista)
 Asamblea Majorera (AM) 
 Canarian Nationalist Party (Partido Nacionalista Canario) (until 2007)
 Centro Canario Independiente (CCI), predecessor of the Centro Canario (CCN)
 Agrupación Tinerfeña de Independientes (ATI)

Electoral performance

Parliament of the Canary Islands

Cortes Generales

European Parliament

See also
 Liberalism in Spain

Notes

References

External links
  Canarian Coalition official site

Political parties in the Canary Islands
Liberal parties in Spain
European Democratic Party
Political parties established in 1993
Regionalist parties in Spain
1993 establishments in Spain
Canarian nationalist parties
Centrist parties in Spain
Liberal conservative parties